Lala Lajpat Rai Institute of Engineering and Technology, Moga (commonly known as LLRIET) is a private college in Moga, Punjab. The institute was set up in 1998, under the supervision of Shiva Educational Trust. It started functioning with the session 1998–1999 after approval from the Punjab government and All India Council for Technical Education (AICTE), New Delhi.

Campus
The LLRIET is at Ghal Kalan which is 8 km from Moga. The campus is spread over 6 acres of land. It is divided into clusters of buildings with state-of-the-art classrooms, labs and a library. There are three boys and two girls hostels. The institution has a cricket ground and volleyball and basketball courts.

Academics

Undergraduate courses
LLRIET Moga offers full-time, four-year undergraduate (Bachelor's degree) program in the following disciplines:
Mechanical Engineering
Computer Science Engineering
Electronics and Communication Engineering
Civil Engineering
Information Technology

Postgraduate courses
Master of Technology (M.Tech.) degrees are offered with the following specializations:
Master of Computer Applications (MCA)
Masters in Business Administration (MBA)
Master of Technology (M.Tech.)

Festivals

 Astron is the annual techno-cultural fest of LLRIET held to give the students exposure to technical expects. It is generally organised in the even semester, in the month of February. It is three days long and it features events that are technical, cultural, literary, and fun.
 Vibrations, an annual function of LLRIET, is an event where students perform cultural activities. 
 Aghaaz is the annual Freshers party organized to celebrate the new students taking admission in the college.

References

External links
  – official website
 PTU official website

All India Council for Technical Education
Engineering colleges in Punjab, India
Moga, Punjab
Memorials to Lala Lajpat Rai
1998 establishments in Punjab, India
Educational institutions established in 1998